Methyl azide is an organic compound with the formula . It is a white solid and it is the simplest organic azide.

Preparation and properties 
Methyl azide can be prepared by the methylation of sodium azide, for instance with dimethyl sulfate in alkaline solution, followed by passing through a tube of anhydrous calcium chloride or sodium hydroxide to remove contaminating hydrazoic acid. The first synthesis was reported in 1905. 

It decomposes in a first-order reaction:

Methyl azide might be a potential precursor in the synthesis of prebiotic molecules via nonequilibrium reactions on interstellar ices initiated by energetic galactic cosmic rays (GCR) and photons.

Safety precautions
Methyl azide is stable at ambient temperature but may explode when heated. Presence of mercury increases the sensitivity to shock and spark. It is incompatible with methanol and dimethyl malonate. It can be stored indefinitely in the dark at −80 °C.

References

External links
 
 

Organoazides
Explosive chemicals
Substances discovered in the 1900s